Buddy (also known as Buddy.Works) is a web-based and self-hosted continuous integration and delivery software for Git developers that can be used to build, test and deploy web sites and applications with code from GitHub, Bitbucket and GitLab. It employs Docker containers with pre-installed languages and frameworks for builds, alongside DevOps, monitoring and notification actions.

History 
Buddy launched as a downloadable VM in May 2015 under the name Meat!. The service was initially free, but employed a proprietary license which stirred some concern in the web development community. Meat! was rebranded to Buddy in November 2015 and released as a cloud-only service. The on-premises version, nicknamed Buddy GO, was released in September 2016. Switching from VM to Docker allowed installation on any Linux-based server, including Amazon EC2, DigitalOcean and Microsoft Azure. Shortly after, the company launched Guides, a dedicated website section with use cases and workflow automation strategies, later reproduced to Medium, a popular blogging platform. On September 21, 2016, the service was featured on Product Hunt.

Configuration 
Configuration is performed by arranging predefined actions into sequences called pipelines. Pipelines can be triggered automatically on push to branch, manually, or recurrently. Actions include Docker-based builds, deployment to FTP/SFTP and IaaS services, delivery to version control, SSH scripts, website monitoring and conditional notifications. Contrary to other CI tools like Jenkins or Travis CI, Buddy does not use YAML files to describe the process, although the company stated support for .yml files is currently in works.

Version control 
Besides the support for third-party hosting services, Buddy features a native code hosting solution with the most popular Git commands (git log, git show, git blame, git diff) reproduced into the GUI. Other features include a cloud editor with blame tool and syntax highlight, push permissions, merge requests and visual branch management.

Available actions 
The service supports over 30 pre-configured actions that can be modified with Linux commands:

Languages and frameworks 
Angular CLI, Gulp, Grunt, Node.js, Maven, Gradle, PHP, Ruby, Python, Elixir, .NET/.NET Core, Go, Ember CLI

Static site generators 
Jekyll, Hexo, Hugo, Middleman

Deployment 
FTP, SFTP, FTPS, Heroku, Microsoft Azure, DigitalOcean, Modulus, Shopify, WebDAV, push to Git

Amazon Web Services 
Amazon S3, Amazon EC2, AWS Elastic Beanstalk, AWS CodeDeploy, AWS Lambda

Google services 
Google Cloud Storage, Google Compute Engine, Google App Engine

DevOps 
SSH commands, HTTP requests, Heroku CLI, Docker image build and push to registry (Docker Hub, Amazon ECR, private registry)

Notifications 
Email, SMS, Slack, Desktop notifications (Pushbullet, Pushover), Activity stream

Website monitoring 
URL request, Ping, TCP port monitoring

References

External links 

 Official website

Bug and issue tracking software
Build automation
Compiling tools
Computing websites
Continuous integration
Cross-platform software
Java development tools
Internet properties established in 2015
Project hosting websites
Version control
Website monitoring software